Chris Bell (born 7 January 1983) is a retired rugby union footballer who played centre with Leeds, Harlequins, Sale Sharks and Wasps. During his time at Leeds he helped them win the 2004–05 Powergen Cup, in the final of which Bell scored a try. He is the older brother of London Irish player Tommy Bell. He retired in 2015 after a shoulder injury.

Honours
Powergen Cup/Anglo-Welsh Cup titles: 1
2005

External links
Sale profile
Leeds profile
England profile
Guinness Premiership Profile

References

English rugby union players
1983 births
Living people
Sale Sharks players
Harlequin F.C. players
Leeds Tykes players
Wasps RFC players
Rugby union centres
Rugby union players from Plymouth, Devon